No. 605 Squadron was formed as an Auxiliary Air Force Squadron. Initially formed as a bomber unit, it was one of the most successful participants of the Battle of Britain. It also had the distinction of being active during the Second World War at two fronts at a time, when the squadron was split up between Malta and the Dutch East Indies. In its last incarnation as an active flying unit, the squadron served as the first jet fighter unit in the post-war Royal Auxiliary Air Force; 616 having already flown Gloster Meteors during the war. No. 605 Squadron was reformed as a RAuxAF Logistic Support Squadron (LSS) on 1 Nov 2014 within No. 85 Expeditionary Logistics Wing of the RAF A4 Force. On the 1 January 2019, the Reserve Logistic Support Wing (RLSW) was established with 501, 504 and 605 LSS Squadron's moving from No. 85 (Expeditionary Logistics) Wing RAF to form RLSW.

History

Formation and early years
No. 605 Squadron was formed on 5 October 1926 at RAF Castle Bromwich as a day bomber unit of the Auxiliary Air Force, recruiting in the Birmingham area. Initially equipped with DH.9As, it received Westland Wapitis in April 1930 and Hawker Harts in October 1934. The latter were replaced by Hawker Hinds in August 1936. On 1 January 1939 No. 605 squadron was re-designated as a fighter squadron and re-equipped with Gloster Gladiators.

Second World War

Hawker Hurricanes began to arrive a few weeks before the outbreak of the Second World War, and the squadron took up its war station at RAF Tangmere with a mixture of six Hurricanes and ten Gladiators, completing re-equipment during October 1939. In February 1940 the squadron moved to Scotland, but returned south in May to fly patrols over northern France for a week before moving back to Scotland at RAF Drem. It again moved south again in September for the closing stages of the Battle of Britain. It then continued to operate from bases in the south, carrying out escort duties and fighter sweeps until posted overseas.

To the middle and far east
In November 1941, the squadron flew off the carrier  to Malta, where it was retained as part of the island's defences, prior to continuing its journey to the Far East. Arriving in Singapore too late to prevent its capture, it moved to Sumatra and then to Java, in the event caught up in the Japanese invasion. It operated any aircraft it could fly until it ceased to exist with its personnel either escaping in small groups or being captured. In the meantime, a small detachment of the squadron had been left on Malta during the transit journey to the Far East and a unit there which began operations on 10 January 1942 used the squadron number in its reports, which ended the following month, on being absorbed into No. 185 Squadron RAF.

Reformation as night intruders
A new No. 605 squadron was formed at RAF Ford on 7 June 1942, equipped with Douglas Boston and Havocs in the intruder role. These were replaced with de Havilland Mosquitoes from February 1943 and it continued to operate this type until the end of the war. During this period, Peter Middleton, the grandfather of the Duchess of Cambridge, was a pilot on the squadron. At this time, the Mosquito pilots used their wing-tips to divert V1 flying bombs off course whilst en route to London. The squadron moved to Belgium in March 1945 and then the Netherlands in April. The squadron disbanded by being re-numbered to No. 4 Squadron RAF on 31 August 1945 at Volkel Air Base.

After the war
With the reactivation of the Royal Auxiliary Air Force, No. 605 squadron was reformed on 10 May 1946 at RAF Honiley as a night fighter squadron, though its initial equipment of Mosquito NF.30s did not arrive until April 1947. In July 1948 the squadron's role was changed to that of a day fighter squadron, for which it received de Havilland Vampire F.1s, replacing them with Vampire FB.5s in May 1951. A little short of six years later the squadron was disbanded, along with all the flying units of the RAuxAF, on 10 March 1957.

Present day

No. 605 (County of Warwick) Squadron was reformed as a RAF Reserve Logistics Support Squadron on 1 Nov 2014 within No. 85 Expeditionary Logistics Wing of the RAF A4 Force. Based at RAF Cosford, near Wolverhampton. The first reservist recruiting event was 30 May 2015, recruiting drivers, chefs, suppliers and police, which will be broken down as 112 part-time and 14 full-time posts. They were fully operational by May 2018.

Aircraft operated

Squadron bases

Commanding Officers

Commanding Officers of 605 Squadron include:

References

Notes

Bibliography

 

 

 (reprinted in 1997)

External links

 Sqn homepage
 Squadron histories for nos. 605–610 sqn on RAFweb
 Battle of Britain website page for 605 sqn
 Official 605 Sqn page on the RAF Website

605
Aircraft squadrons of the Royal Air Force in World War II
RAF squadrons involved in the Battle of Britain
Military units and formations established in 1926